Jamie Winborn (born May 14, 1979) is a former American football linebacker. He was drafted by the San Francisco 49ers in the second round of the 2001 NFL Draft. He played college football at Vanderbilt.

Winborn has also played for the Jacksonville Jaguars, Tampa Bay Buccaneers, Denver Broncos, Atlanta Falcons and Houston Texans.

Early years
Winborn played high school football at Wetumpka High School in Wetumpka, Alabama, where he played linebacker and fullback. During his senior year, he  named all-metro, all-region, all-district and second-team all-state after posting 137 tackles.

College career
Winborn played college football for the Vanderbilt Commodores, where he was a three-year starter. He led the Southeastern Conference (SEC) in tackles during his freshman and sophomore seasons. Because of his great play he was honored with second-team All-America by Football News and was a First-team All-SEC during his sophomore year and All-American by The Sporting News during his freshman year. He finished his college career with 377 tackles, 16.5 sacks, and two forced fumbles.

Professional career

San Francisco 49ers
Winborn was drafted by the San Francisco 49ers in the second round of the 2001 NFL Draft. He would go on to play five years for the 49ers, recording 190 tackles, nine sacks, and three interceptions.

Jacksonville Jaguars
On October 8, 2005, Winborn was traded to the Jacksonville Jaguars for a seventh round draft pick in the 2006 NFL Draft. He would finish his short time with the Jaguars playing in five games and recording four tackles.

Tampa Bay Buccaneers
On April 4, 2006, he signed with the Tampa Bay Buccaneers. He would spend one season with the Bucs playing in 14 games, recording 12 tackles.

Denver Broncos
On September 11, 2007, he signed with the Denver Broncos. In two years with the team he started 13 of 30 games, recording 133 tackles and a sack. The Broncos released him on February 16, 2009.

Atlanta Falcons
Winborn was signed by the Atlanta Falcons on August 1, 2009, and cut on September 5, 2009.

Houston Texans
Winborn signed with the Houston Texans on October 21, 2009. He was waived on October 30.

Tennessee Titans
Winborn signed with the Tennessee Titans on December 21, 2009, after linebackers Keith Bulluck and David Thornton were placed on injured reserve. On 9 October 2010, Winborn was released by the Titans, in order for the Titans to move linebacker Gerald McRath off the Reserve/Suspended list and onto the active roster. For the season to that point (four games), Winborn started three games and had eight tackles.

References

External links
Denver Broncos bio
Tampa Bay Buccaneers bio
Tennessee Titans bio

1979 births
Living people
Players of American football from Alabama
American football linebackers
Vanderbilt Commodores football players
San Francisco 49ers players
Jacksonville Jaguars players
Tampa Bay Buccaneers players
Denver Broncos players
Atlanta Falcons players
Houston Texans players
Tennessee Titans players
People from Wetumpka, Alabama
Ed Block Courage Award recipients